Jeanne-Marie Leprince de Beaumont (26 April 17118 September 1780) was a French novelist who wrote the best known version of Beauty and the Beast. Her third husband was the French spy Thomas Pichon (1757–1760).

Life and work
Christened Marie-Barbe, she was born in 1711 in Rouen, the daughter of Barbe Plantart and Jean-Baptiste Le Prince, and died in 1778. She lost her mother when she was eleven years old. She and her younger sister were subsequently mentored by two wealthy women who enrolled them into the convent school at Ernemont in Rouen. Upon completing their educations, they remained there as teachers from 1725 to 1735.

De Beaumont then obtained a prestigious position as a singing teacher to the children at the Court of the Duke of Lorraine, Stanisław Leszczyński, at Lunéville.

Her first marriage was in 1737 to the dancer Antoine Malter. Details of a second marriage to Grimard de Beaumont are unclear. However, it is known that she bore a daughter, named Elisabeth, by Beaumont.

In 1748, having separated from Beaumont in reaction to his marital infidelities, she left France to become a governess in London.  She wrote several fairy tales, among them an abridged version of Beauty and the Beast, adapted from Gabrielle-Suzanne Barbot de Villeneuve's original. After a successful publishing career in England, she left that country in 1763 with her daughter Elisabeth and son-in-law Moreau. She lived first in Savoy, near the city of Annecy, then moved to Avallon near Dijon in 1774 (see her personal letter #21 dated 22 December 1774 to Thomas Tyrrell).

Her first work, the moralistic novel The Triumph of Truth (Le Triomphe de la vérité), was published in 1748. She published approximately seventy volumes during her literary career. Most famous were the collections she called "magasins," instructional handbooks for parents and educators of students from childhood through adolescence. She was one of the first to include folk tales as moralist and educational tools in her writings

She published the magazine Le Nouveau Magasin français, ou Bibliothèque instructive et amusante between 1750 and 1752, and contributed with articles to the British newspaper The Spectator during her years in London.

In fiction 
Because of her relationship in London with the French spy Thomas Pichon (1700-1781), she is a character in a novel entitled Crossings : A Thomas Pichon Novel, by A. J. B. Johnston. However, in that fictional appearance the dates for her relationship with Pichon are not accurate.

Works

   (1st edition 1758)

Fairy tales
Magasin des enfants
 Le Prince Chéri (Prince Darling)
 La Curiosité (The Curiosity)
 La Belle et la Bête (Beauty and the Beast)
 Le Prince Fatal et le Prince Fortuné (Prince Fatal and Prince Fortune)
 Le Prince Charmant (Prince Charming)
 La Veuve et ses deux filles (The Widow and her Two Daughters)
 Le Prince Désir (Prince Hyacinth and the Dear Little Princess)
 Aurore et Aimée (Aurore and Aimée)
 Conte des trois souhaits (The Tale of the Three Wishes)
 Conte du pêcheur et du voyageur (The Tale of the Fisherman and the Traveler)
 Joliette
 Le Prince Tity (Prince Tity)
 Le Prince Spirituel (Prince Spirituel)
 Belote et Laidronette (Belote and Laidronette)
 Morlock te Money (Morlock te Money)

References

External links

 
 
 
 http://www.chawtonhouse.org/wp-content/uploads/2012/06/Leprince-de-Beaumont2.pdf

1711 births
1780 deaths
Writers from Rouen
18th-century French writers
18th-century French women writers
18th-century French novelists
French women novelists
Collectors of fairy tales
Women folklorists
Women science fiction and fantasy writers
18th-century French journalists
18th-century women journalists